Middle Town, Isles of Scilly, may refer to two different settlements on two different islands within the Isles of Scilly:

 Middle Town, St Agnes
 Middle Town, St Martin's